In auction theory, particularly Bayesian-optimal mechanism design, a virtual valuation of an agent is a function that measures the surplus that can be extracted from that agent.

A typical application is a seller who wants to sell an item to a potential buyer and wants to decide on the optimal price. The optimal price depends on the valuation of the buyer to the item, . The seller does not know   exactly, but he assumes that  is a random variable, with some cumulative distribution function  and probability distribution function . 

The virtual valuation of the agent is defined as:

Applications 
A key theorem of Myerson says that:
The expected profit of any truthful mechanism is equal to its expected virtual surplus.

In the case of a single buyer, this implies that the price  should be determined according to the equation:

This guarantees that the buyer will buy the item, if and only if his virtual-valuation is weakly-positive, so the seller will have a weakly-positive expected profit.

This exactly equals the optimal sale price – the price that maximizes the expected value of the seller's profit, given the distribution of valuations:

Virtual valuations can be used to construct Bayesian-optimal mechanisms also when there are multiple buyers, or different item-types.

Examples 
1. So:
 
 
 
 , so the optimal single-item price is 1/2.

2. The buyer's valuation has a normal distribution with mean 0 and standard deviation 1.  is monotonically increasing, and crosses the x-axis in about 0.75, so this is the optimal price. The crossing point moves right when the standard deviation is larger.

Regularity 
A probability distribution function is called regular if its virtual-valuation function is weakly-increasing. Regularity is important because it implies that the virtual-surplus can be maximized by a truthful mechanism.

A sufficient condition for regularity is monotone hazard rate, which means that the following function is weakly-increasing:

Monotone-hazard-rate implies regularity, but the opposite is not true.

See also 
 Myerson ironing
 Algorithmic pricing

References 

Mechanism design